Thobias Andengenye is the regional commissioner for Kigoma Region in Tanzania. From 2016 to January 2020 he was Commissioner general of the Tanzania fire and rescue force. Former president Magufuli dismissed Andengenye alongside minister Kangi Lugola in January 2020 due to alleged procurement irregularities. In July 2020 he was appointed Kigoma regional commissioner.

References

Tanzanian police officers
University of Dar es Salaam alumni
Living people
Year of birth missing (living people)